Serhiy Mykolayovych Pshenychnykh (born 19 November 1981 in Kharkiv) is a Ukrainian football defender.

Career
He played for Metalist Kharkiv and Stal Dniprodzerzhynsk in the Ukrainian Premier League.

External links
 
 Profile 
 
 

1981 births
Living people
Footballers from Kharkiv
Ukrainian footballers
Ukrainian expatriate footballers
Ukrainian Premier League players
FC Karpaty Lviv players
FC Vorskla Poltava players
FC Metalist Kharkiv players
FC Borysfen Boryspil players
Czech First League players
SFC Opava players
Expatriate footballers in the Czech Republic
Ukrainian expatriate sportspeople in the Czech Republic
FC Stal Kamianske players
Association football defenders